No Blue Thing is Ray Lynch’s fourth studio album, released on August 15, 1989. It peaked at #1 on Billboard's "Top New Age Albums" chart as well as #197 on Billboard's "Top 200 Albums". The album also peaked at #16 on Gavin Report.

Production
In an interview with Keyboard, Lynch said that he recorded between two and seven versions of the same song. Lynch also told Keyboard that "The True Spirit of Mom and Dad" took him about eight months to complete.

Reception
Keith Tuber of Orange Coast praised the album, commentating that Ray Lynch "has a way with melodies, combining classical, acoustic and synthesized pop elements.". JA of Keyboard noted that the some of the album is "more of the same" from Deep Breakfast; JA wrote that the "DX patches have a little more bit this time, but the trick of running staccato patterns through a delay line in triplet rhythm hadn't changed" and that the album, like his previous works, lack percussion instruments. JA concluded that the listeners may or may not like the album. Robert Carlberg of Electronic Musician compared the album to Reed Maidenberg's Unexpected Beauty, praising the album for its combination of electronic and acoustic instruments but criticizing it for having an overreliance of arpeggiations as well as its use of "plodding" time signatures and for its "warm, fuzzy" instrumentation. Carlberg concluded that the album's flaws "rob [both Lynch and Maidenberg] of whatever vitality classical training would bring." John Diliberto of Jazziz Magazine criticized the album, calling it formulaic and concluded that the album "breaks no new ground". Gavin Report wrote that each track on the album is worthy of the listener's attention, especially "The True Spirit of Mom & Dad", which was described as the "climactic final track" of the album.

Track listing
No Blue Thing includes the following tracks.

Personnel 
All music composed, arranged, and produced by Ray Lynch.

 Ray Lynch – keyboards, classical guitar
 Tom Canning – "guitar" keyboards on "Clouds Below Your Knees"
 Timothy Day –  flute
 Julie Ann Giacobassi – oboe and English horn
 Amy Hiraga – violin
 David Kadarauch and Peter Wyrick – cello
 Basil Vendryes and Geraldine Walther – viola

Production 
 Mastered by Bernie Grundman  (Bernie Grundman Mastering, Hollywood, California)
 Mixed by Ray Lynch and Daniel Ryman at Ray Lynch Productions studio except for “Evenings, Yes” (Recorded at Different Fur, San Francisco; engineered by Howard Johnston; mixed at Mobius, San Francisco)

Charts

References

Ray Lynch albums
1989 albums
Music West Records albums
Windham Hill Records albums